Ais Kosong is 2016 Malaysian Tamil-language adventure comedy film. It tells the story of three strangers who go on a road trip to Penang together, but accidentally come between two crime gangs. The film was released in Malaysia on 3 March 2016.

It is directed by Manan Subra and acted by Alvin Martin, Sasikumar Kandasamy, Anu Ramamoorthy, Sangabalan, Shamini Ramasamy, Kristina Vinokree, Nanthakumar, Pradeep Singh Sivakumar and Vishnukumar Elangovan.

Synopsis
Three strangers met by chance and went on a road trip to Penang. On their journey north, they unknowingly played havoc and poured cold water on the plans of two crime gangs who are at war with each other. Now they have to run before it is too late.

Cast
 Alvin Martin
 Sasikumar Kandasamy
 Anu Ramamoorthy
 Sangabalan
 Shamini Ramasamy
 Kristina Vinokree
 Nanthakumar
 Pradeep Singh
 Sivakumar
 Vishnukumar Elangovan

Soundtrack
The original soundtrack for the movie, Vere Level is written and performed by DR Burn.

Reception 
A critic from The Star wrote that "In the meantime, to those who have yet to watch Ais Kosong, do support this local film and have a great laugh as it is an entertaining movie".

References

External links

Malaysian adventure films
Films set in Malaysia
2016 films
2010s Tamil-language films
Tamil-language Malaysian films
Malaysian comedy films
Malaysian crime films